Events in the year 1956 in Japan.

Incumbents
 Emperor: Hirohito
 Prime Minister: Ichirō Hatoyama (Liberal Democratic) until December 23, Tanzan Ishibashi (Liberal Democratic)
Chief Cabinet Secretary: Ryutaro Nemoto until December 23, Hirohide Ishida
Chief Justice of the Supreme Court: Kōtarō Tanaka
President of the House of Representatives: Shūji Masutani
President of the House of Councillors: Yahachi Kawai until April 3, Tsuruhei Matsuno

Governors
Aichi Prefecture: Mikine Kuwahara 
Akita Prefecture: Yūjirō Obata 
Aomori Prefecture: Bunji Tsushima (until 1 June); Iwao Yamazaki (starting 20 July)
Chiba Prefecture: Hitoshi Shibata 
Ehime Prefecture: Sadatake Hisamatsu 
Fukui Prefecture: Seiichi Hane 
Fukuoka Prefecture: Taichi Uzaki
Fukushima Prefecture: Sakuma Ootake 
Gifu Prefecture: Kamon Muto 
Gunma Prefecture: Shigeo Kitano (until 1 August); Toshizo Takekoshi (starting 2 August)
Hiroshima Prefecture: Hiroo Ōhara 
Hokkaido: Toshifumi Tanaka 
Hyogo Prefecture: Masaru Sakamoto 
Ibaraki Prefecture: Yoji Tomosue 
Ishikawa Prefecture: Jūjitsu Taya 
Iwate Prefecture: Senichi Abe 
Kagawa Prefecture: Masanori Kaneko 
Kagoshima Prefecture: Katsushi Terazono 
Kanagawa Prefecture: Iwataro Uchiyama 
Kochi Prefecture: Masumi Mizobuchi 
Kumamoto Prefecture: Saburō Sakurai 
Kyoto Prefecture: Torazō Ninagawa 
Mie Prefecture: Satoru Tanaka 
Miyagi Prefecture: Otogorō Miyagi (until 4 October); Yasushi Onuma (starting 5 October)
Miyazaki Prefecture: Jingo Futami 
Nagano Prefecture: Torao Hayashi 
Nagasaki Prefecture: Takejirō Nishioka 
Nara Prefecture: Ryozo Okuda 
Niigata Prefecture: Kazuo Kitamura
Oita Prefecture: Kaoru Kinoshita 
Okayama Prefecture: Yukiharu Miki 
Osaka Prefecture: Bunzō Akama 
Saga Prefecture: Naotsugu Nabeshima 
Saitama Prefecture: Yuuichi Oosawa (until 29 May); Hiroshi Kurihara (starting 16 July)
Shiga Prefecture: Kotaro Mori 
Shiname Prefecture: Yasuo Tsunematsu 
Shizuoka Prefecture: Toshio Saitō 
Tochigi Prefecture: Kiichi Ogawa 
Tokushima Prefecture: Kikutaro Hara 
Tokyo: Seiichirō Yasui 
Tottori Prefecture: Shigeru Endo 
Toyama Prefecture: Kunitake Takatsuji (until 30 September); Minoru Yoshida (starting 1 October)
Wakayama Prefecture: Shinji Ono 
Yamagata Prefecture: Tōkichi Abiko 
Yamaguchi Prefecture: Taro Ozawa 
Yamanashi Prefecture: Hisashi Amano

Events
 January 1 - According to Japanese government officially confirmed report, human stampede hit during newyear festival in Yahiko Shrine, Niigata Prefecture, 124 person were perished, 77 person were hurt.
 April 10 – Sanwa Shutter was founded in Amagasaki, Hyogo Prefecture.
 May 3 - The first World Judo Championships are held at the Kuramae Kokugikan, Tokyo.
 July 8 - House of Councillors election held.
 October 15 – According to Japan Transport Ministry official confirmed report, two trains crush in Rokken rail accident in Mie Prefecture, official death toll was 42 persons, with 94 persons were hurt. 
 October 19 - Soviet–Japanese Joint Declaration of 1956 signed.
 October 28 – A landmark spot in Osaka, Tsūtenkaku was rebuilt, after it caught fire and was demolished in 1943.
 December 12 - Japan becomes a member of the United Nations

Births
 January 1 - Kōji Yakusho, actor
 January 3 - Tomiko Suzuki, voice actress
 January 5 - Chen Kenichi, chef
 February 5 – Mao Daichi, actress (Takarazuka Revue)
 February 15 - Miyoko Asada, actress
 February 16 – Takayoshi Nakao, former professional baseball player 
 February 23 - Goro Noguchi, singer and actor
 February 26 - Keisuke Kuwata, musician
 February 27 – Kenji Niinuma, enka singer 
 March 13 – Motoharu Sano, musician and singer-songwriter 
 March 20 - Naoto Takenaka, actor, comedian, singer and director
 March 24 – Shinsuke Shimada, former television presenter
 April 8 - Yoshiko Tanaka, actress  (d. 2011)
 April 12 - Yasuo Tanaka, politician and novelist
 May 28 - Sayuri Yamauchi, voice actress
 May 31 - Yoshiko Sakakibara, voice actress
 June 27 – Takeshi Nishimoto, former professional baseball pitcher 
 July 15 - Toshihiko Seko, long-distance runner
 July 19 - Yoshiaki Yatsu, professional wrestler
 August 4 - Mika Doi, voice actress
 August 25 – Takeshi Okada, association footballer and football coach  
 August 31 - Masashi Tashiro, television performer
 September 7 – Tsuyoshi Nagabuchi, singer-songwriter 
 September 20 - Makiko Kinoshita, composer 
 October 26 – Machiko Watanabe, singer and singer-songwriter  
 December 19 - Masami Akita, noise musician, (aka Merzbow)

Deaths
January 4 – Makoto Nishimura, biologist (b. 1883)
June 3 – Fukushi Masaichi, physician and pathologist (b. 1878)

See also
 List of Japanese films of 1956

References

 
Years of the 20th century in Japan
Japan